Credner Glacier is on Mount Kilimanjaro in Tanzania, on the northwest slope of the peak and is a remnant of an icecap which once crowned the top of Mount Kilimanjaro. Credner Glacier is one of the largest glaciers on the mountain and descends from the Northern Ice Field. Credner is rapidly retreating due to its high exposure point on the northwest slope of Mount Kilimanjaro. A report published in 2013 indicated that in another decade the glacier may no longer exist.

Gallery

See also
Retreat of glaciers since 1850
List of glaciers in Africa

References

Glaciers of Tanzania